The Zerg are a race of insectoid aliens obsessed with assimilating other races into their swarm in pursuit of genetic perfection, and the overriding antagonists for much of the StarCraft franchise. Unlike the fictional universe's other primary races, the Protoss and Terrans, the Zerg lack technological inclination. Instead, they "force-evolve" genetic traits by directed mutation in order to match such technology. Operating as a hive mind-linked "chain of command", the Zerg strive for "genetic perfection" by assimilating the unique genetic code of advanced species deemed "worthy" into their own gene pool, creating numerous variations of specialized strains of Zerg gifted with unique adaptations. Despite being notoriously cunning and ruthlessly efficient, the majority of Zerg species have low intelligence, becoming mindless beasts if not connected to a "hive-cluster" or a "command entity".

As with the other races, the Zerg are the subject of a full single-player campaign in each of the series' real-time strategy video games. Zerg units are designed to be cost-efficient and fast to produce, encouraging players to overwhelm their opponents with sheer numerical advantage. Since the release of StarCraft, the Zerg have become a gaming icon, described by PC Gamer UK as "the best race in strategy history". The term "Zerg Rush", or "zerging", is now commonly used to describe sacrificing economic development in favor of using many cheap, yet weak units to overwhelm an enemy by attrition or sheer numbers. The tactic is infamous; most experienced real-time strategy players are familiar with the tactic in one form or another.

Attributes

Biology 
Zerg have two cell types at birth — one which creates random mutations, and another that hunts these mutations — the result being that any mutations that survive are the strongest of all. Despite being a hive-minded species, the Zerg understand the principles of evolution and incorporate this into the development of their species. Zerg purposely situate themselves in harsh climates in order to further their own evolution through natural selection. Only the strongest with the best mutations survive, and they assimilate only the strongest species into their gene pool.

Society 
It was stated in an interview by Blizzard employees that the Zerg Swarm are universally feared, hated, and hunted by all the sapient species of the Milky Way. The Zerg are a collective consciousness of a variety of different species assimilated into the Zerg genome. The Swarms' organization, psychological and economic, is more like that of ants or termites: they are communal entities, a people efficiently adapted by evolution. Every thousand Zerg warriors killed at a cost of one Terran soldier was a net victory for the Zerg; the Zerg Swarn didn't care any more about expending warriors than the Terrans cared about expending ammunition.

The Zerg were originally commanded by and unified by their absolute obedience to the Zerg collective sentience known as the Zerg Overmind, a manifestation of this hive mind, and under the Overmind's control the Zerg strove for genetic perfection by assimilating the favorable traits of other species. Zerg creatures are rapidly and selectively evolved into deadly and efficient killers to further the driving Zerg imperative of achieving absolute domination. After a species has been assimilated into the Swarm, it is mutated toward a different function within its hierarchy, from being a hive worker to a warrior strain. StarCraft's manual notes that some species bear little resemblance to their original forms after just a short time into assimilation (an example would be the formerly peaceful Slothien species, which was assimilated and mutated into the vicious Hydralisk strain and so on). The Overmind controls the Swarm through secondary agents called cerebrates. Cerebrates command an individual brood of Zerg, each with a distinct tactical role within the hierarchy. Cerebrates further delegate power through the use of overlords for battlefield direction and queens for hive watch.

The quest for 'genetic perfection' is a pseudo-religious concept to Zerg that drives them on a steady state of evolution and conflict; the zerg believed there was a state that the zerg could reach where they no longer needed to evolve, that their evolutionary form would never have to change again because they could already adapt to any situation. Abathur, an evolution master, doubted that this was possible, but reasoned that "chasing the illusion of perfection" was, regardless, tactically sound.

The vast majority of the Zerg do not have any free will as they are genetically forced to obey the commands of those further up the Zerg hierarchy, although they are sufficiently intelligent to form strategies and work as a team on the battlefield. Despite this, the average Zerg has no sense of self preservation. Along with the Overmind, the cerebrates are the only Zerg with full sapience, each with its own personality and methods, although they too are genetically incapable of disobeying the Overmind. The Overmind also possesses the ability to reincarnate its cerebrates should their bodies be killed, although Protoss dark templar energies are capable of disrupting this process. If a cerebrate is completely dead and cannot be reincarnated, the Overmind loses control of the cerebrate's brood, causing it to mindlessly rampage and attack anything. As a result of the Overmind's death in StarCraft and the subsequent destruction of a new Overmind in Brood War, the remaining cerebrates perished, as they could not survive without an Overmind.  Sarah Kerrigan replaced the cerebrates with "brood mothers".  These creatures fulfil much the same purpose, but are loyal to Kerrigan and could survive her temporary departure during the events of Starcraft 2.

An exception to all of this would be the Primal Zerg, who inhabit the original Zerg homeworld of Zerus (as seen in Heart of the Swarm). The Zerg Hive Mind was created to control the Zerg, and eventually put them under the control of the main antagonist of the series, the fallen Xel'Naga Amon. Some Zerg, however, managed to avoid being subsumed. These are the Primal Zerg, who have much the same genetic abilities but are not bound to the Overmind. These creatures are each independently sapient, and if they follow a leader it is because they choose to. Their lack of a Hive Mind also shields them from specific psionic attacks engineered to counter the Zerg Hive Mind.

Zerg worlds 
Zerg have conquered and/or infested many worlds, but only two of them are important:

Zerus: Jungle world. Located in the galactic core' Theta quadrant of the Milky Way. It is the birthworld of the zerg. The position of the Zerus is known from the manual. It is situated near the Galaxy core. The Galaxy disc has a radius of 49 000 LY. The Zerg covered some 30-40 000 LY during their search for Protoss homeworld.
Char: Volcanic world. Current Zerg capital world. Former Terran Dominions world. The new Overmind grew here, but later it was enslaved by the United Earth Directorate (UED). Eventually the planet was regained by the Zerg under Kerrigan's control. The Zerg settled to infest other Terran worlds during their search, lies on the borders of the Terran sector. Because the Zerg ran across the Terrans first, it can implicate, that the Koprulu sector lies approximately on the line with Zerus, Char and Aiur.

Depiction 
The Zerg were created from the native lifeforms of Zerus, who had the natural ability to absorb the "essence" of creatures they killed, transforming their bodies to gain new adaptations. The Xel'Naga created the Overmind and bound the primal Zerg to its will.  They gave the Overmind a powerful desire to travel across the stars and absorb useful lifeforms into the Swarm, particularly the Protoss, their previous creation, so as to become the ultimate lifeform.

The Zerg are a completely organic race, making no use of lifeless technology and instead using specialized organisms for every function efficiently fulfilled through biological adaptation and planned mutation of the Zerg strains. Their buildings are specialized organs within the living, growing organism of a Zerg nest, as are the Leviathans "space ships" that carry them across space. Zerg colonies produce a carpet of bio-matter referred to as the "creep", which essentially provides nourishment for Zerg structures and creatures. The visual aesthetic of the Zerg greatly resembles that of invertebrates such as crustaceans and insects (and certainly draws inspiration from the creatures from the Alien movies). The Zerg are shown to be highly dependent on their command structure: if a Zerg should lose its connection to the hive mind, it may turn passive and incapable of action, or become completely uncontrollable and attack allies and enemies alike.

Zerg buildings and units are entirely organic in-game, and all Zerg can regenerate slowly without assistance (though not as quickly as Protoss shields or Terran medivac). Zerg production is far more centralized than with the Terrans and Protoss; a central hatchery must be utilized to create new Zerg, with other structures providing the necessary technology tree assets, whereas the other two races can produce units from several structures. Zerg units tend to be weaker than those of the other two races, but are also cheaper, allowing for rush tactics to be used. Some Zerg units are capable of infesting enemies with various parasites that range from being able to see what an enemy unit sees to spawning Zerg inside an enemy unit. In addition, Zerg can infest some Terran buildings, allowing for the production of special infested Terran units.

Appearances 
In StarCraft, the Zerg are obsessed with the pursuit of genetic purity, and are the focus of the game's second episode. With the Xel'Naga–empowered Protoss targeted as the ultimate lifeform, the Zerg invade the Terran colonies in the Koprulu Sector to assimilate the Terrans' psionic potential and give the Zerg an edge over the Protoss. Through the actions of the Sons of Korhal, the Zerg are lured to the Confederate capital Tarsonis, where they capture the psionic ghost agent Sarah Kerrigan and infest her. Returning to the Zerg base of operations on Char, the Zerg are attacked by the dark templar Zeratul, who accidentally gives the location of the Protoss homeworld Aiur to the Zerg Overmind. With victory in sight, the Overmind launches an invasion of Aiur and manifests itself on the planet. However, at the end of the game, the Protoss high templar Tassadar sacrifices himself to destroy the Overmind, leaving the Zerg to run rampant and leaderless across the planet.

The Zerg return in Brood War initially as uncontrolled indiscriminate killers without the will of the Overmind to guide them. Through the early portions of Brood War, Sarah Kerrigan is at odds with the surviving cerebrates, who have formed a new Overmind to restore control of the Swarm. Through allying herself with the Protoss, Kerrigan strikes at the cerebrates, causing disruption of their plans. Eventually, the UED fleet takes control of Char and pacifies the new Overmind with drugs, putting the cerebrates and most of the Zerg under their control. Kerrigan retaliates by forming a tenuous alliance with the remnants of the Dominion and the forces of Jim Raynor and Fenix, their subsequent victories turning the tide against the UED. However, she later betrays the alliance by dealing long-term damage to the infrastructures of her allies and killing Fenix. Proceeding to blackmail Zeratul into killing the new Overmind, Kerrigan's forces destroy the remnants of the UED fleet, giving her full control of the Zerg and establishing the Swarm as the most powerful faction in the sector.

In StarCraft II: Wings of Liberty, Jim Raynor and the rebel forces who oppose both the Dominion and the Zerg, manage to secure an ancient Xel'Naga artifact and after successfully infiltrating Char, they use it to subjugate the Zerg and restore Kerrigan's human form. Once again without a unified leadership, the Zerg get divided into multiple broods feuding over control of the Swarm. This situation persists until the events of StarCraft II: Heart of the Swarm.  Kerrigan, believing Raynor to have been killed in a Dominion surprise attack, enters the original Zerg spawning pool to become the Queen of Blades again. This time she is no longer motivated to destroy humanity, having kept more of her original mindset due to the non-interference of the Zerg Hive Mind, and by extension, the Dark Voice, Amon.

Kerrigan is the protagonist and player character of StarCraft II: Heart of the Swarm. After being deinfested, she was taken in Valerian Mengsk's hideout to research on her, until the Dominion attacks the facility, she escaped along with the rest of the facility, except Raynor, who was captured by Nova. She later learned that Raynor was executed and seeks revenge on Arcturus. As she enters a Leviathan, she controls the local Swarm inside, and starts rebuilding her forces from scratch. She later evolved into a Primal Zerg after a confrontation with Zeratul, leading her to the origins of the Zerg. She became a Primal, after absorbing the spawning pool and killing Primal Leaders to collect essence. With her newfound power, she initially takes the fight to the Dominion after subduing countless Queens. She was later shocked after she knows that Raynor survived and held by Dominion as a bargaining chip. She organizes a raid, rescuing Raynor but the man fell into disbelief that the one he saved, returns to being a monster. She also confronted an ancient Shapeshifter creating Hybrids at the behest of her former rival named Alexei Stukov. She later prepared to end Arcturus Mengsk's reign by killing him in his palace in Korhal. She later left to confront the Shapeshifter's master and only by allied effort, they finished them. Kerrigan left them to her Broodmother Zagara's control.

Comparison with other factions

Protoss
Protoss units are generally more expensive and slower to produce in-game compared to Zerg or Terran units, but are also more powerful and efficient in combat. All Protoss units and buildings are protected by a regenerating energy shield, further increasing the amount of damage that they can withstand. Although there is no way of natively healing or repairing Protoss units, injured biological units can be healed by friendly Terran or Zerg medical units, and damaged mechanicals can be repaired by a late-stage Spear of Adun upgrade, or by the Carrier unit.

Terrans
In-game, Terrans tend to favor traditional modes of warfare, often utilizing combined arms tactics with tanks, aircraft or other combat vehicles in combination with regular infantry. Using light ballistics, large calibre weapons and even tactical nuclear warheads, many Terran units are reminiscent of present-day designs. Terrans are more adaptive than the other two races and are able to produce units at an average expense. Primary base structures can even lift off and fly to other locations, allowing players to move buildings for quicker troop deployments, access to new resource locations or to save the structures from destruction by the enemy. Terran buildings and mechanized units can be repaired if damaged, and combat medics can heal wounded organic units.

Reception
One of the main factors responsible for StarCraft's positive reception is the attention paid to the three unique playable races, for each of which Blizzard developed completely different characteristics, graphics, backstories, and styles of gameplay, while keeping them balanced in performance against each other. Previous to this, most real-time strategy games consisted of factions and races with the same basic "chess" play styles and units with only superficial differences. The use of unique sides and asymmetric warfare in StarCraft has been credited with popularizing the concept within the real-time strategy genre. Contemporary reviews of the game have mostly praised the attention to the gameplay balance between the species, as well as the fictional narratives built around them.

In their review for StarCraft, IGN's Tom Chick stated that the balance and difference between the races was "remarkable", continuing to praise the game's "radical" approach to different races and its high degree of success when compared with other games in the genre. IGN was also positive about the unit arrangements for the three races, crediting Blizzard Entertainment for not letting units become obsolete during extended play and for showing an "extraordinary amount of patience in balancing them." GameSpot was complimentary of the species in its review for StarCraft, describing the races as being full of personality. Stating that the use of distinct races allowed for the game "to avoid the problem [of equal sides] that has plagued every other game in the genre", GameSpot praised Blizzard Entertainment for keeping it "well balanced despite the great diversity."

Other reviews have echoed much of this positive reception. The site The Gamers' Temple described the species as "very diverse but well-balanced, " stating that this allowed for "a challenging and fun gaming experience." Allgame stated that the inclusion of three "dynamic" species "raises the bar" for real-time strategy games, complimenting the game for forcing the player to "learn how [the aliens'] minds work and not think like a human". Commentators have also praised the aesthetic design of the three races; in particular, the powered armor worn by the Terran Marine was rated eleventh on in a Maxim feature on the top armor suits in video games, and ninth in a similar feature by Machinima.com.

This positive view, however, is not universally held. For example, Computer and Video Games, while describing the game as "highly playable, " nevertheless described a "slight feeling of déjà vu" between the three races.

References 

Fictional extraterrestrial life forms
Fictional superorganisms
StarCraft characters
Video game species and races
Video game characters introduced in 1998